Visual Risk was a Treasury Management software provider and consulting company headquartered in Sydney, Australia. Visual Risk is now part of GTreasury and its software and services are now under the GTreasury name. The company provides treasury and risk management software and specializes in market risk management.

History
Visual Risk was one of Australia's original Fintech companies.  The company is a treasury software provider. Visual Risk was founded by Richard Hughes and Paul Nailand, and is headquartered in Sydney. Richard Hughes and Paul Nailand currently serve as Managing Directors of Visual Risk.

In December 2015 Visual Risk won best Risk Management Solution in the Treasury Management International's 2015 awards, the awards are considered the benchmark in the industry. 

In April 2018 GTreasury acquired Visual Risk and integrated Visual Risk's Risk Management software into its own offering to bolster its existing treasury and cash management tool.

Product 
Visual Risk is a modular Treasury Risk Management system that consists of five modules: risk Analytics, asset-liability management, treasury management, hedge accounting, and cash and liquidity. This modular system can be used separately or as a fully integrated system. In addition, Visual Risk provides a reporting dashboard. The software is deployed either locally or via the cloud.

Partnerships 
In 2014, Visual Risk partnered with KPMG Australia. Visual Risk will analyze KPMG's hedging transactions and client exposures.

References

Risk management companies
Cloud computing providers